Eidsvold West is a rural locality in the North Burnett Region, Queensland, Australia.

History 
The name Eidsvold is the name of the pastoral run operated in 1847-48 by Thomas Archer and David Archer, using the name of the town in Norway where the Norwegian constitution was signed in 1814.

Road infrastructure
The Eidsvold–Theodore Road (State Route 73) runs through from east to west.

References 

North Burnett Region
Localities in Queensland